The 1999–2000 season saw Dundee compete in the Scottish Premier League where they finished in 7th position with 41 points.

Final league table

Results
Dundee's score comes first

Legend

Scottish Premier League

Scottish Cup

Scottish League Cup

References

External links
 Dundee 1999–2000 at Soccerbase.com (select relevant season from dropdown list)

Dundee F.C. seasons
Dundee